Vương Thị Huyền (born 22 June 1992) is a Vietnamese weightlifter. In 2016, she represented Vietnam at the 2016 Summer Olympics held in Rio de Janeiro, Brazil in the women's 48kg event. She did not finish as she failed to register a successful result in the Snatch event.

In 2018, she competed in the women's 48kg event at the Asian Games held in Jakarta, Indonesia. She finished in 4th place.

In 2020, she won the bronze medal in the women's 49kg event at the Roma 2020 World Cup in Rome, Italy. In 2021, she finished in 5th place in the women's 49kg event at the 2020 Asian Weightlifting Championships held in Tashkent, Uzbekistan.

References

External links 
 

Living people
1992 births
Sportspeople from Hanoi
Vietnamese female weightlifters
Weightlifters at the 2016 Summer Olympics
Olympic weightlifters of Vietnam
Weightlifters at the 2018 Asian Games
Asian Games competitors for Vietnam
Southeast Asian Games gold medalists for Vietnam
Southeast Asian Games medalists in weightlifting
Competitors at the 2019 Southeast Asian Games
21st-century Vietnamese women
20th-century Vietnamese women